Physcia aipolia is a species of lichen in the family Physciaceae. It has a worldwide distribution.

Physcia aipolia is a known host species to the lichenicolous fungus species Muellerella lichenicola.

References

Lecanoromycetes
Lichen species
Lichens described in 1839
Taxa named by Jakob Friedrich Ehrhart